General Sher Mohammad Karimi (born November 11, 1945) was the Chief of Army Staff in the Military of Afghanistan. An ethnic Pashtun, Karimi was born in Khost Province of Afghanistan.

After the 1978 Saur Revolution in Afghanistan, Karimi was arrested and incarcerated by the Khalq faction of the PDPA communist party because of his Western education. He was employed as a director during Dr. Mohammad Najibullah Government in ministry of defence. Unlike many of his communist colleagues and the majority of the Afghan officer corps, Karimi had never received training in the Soviet Union. He was eventually forced into exile in Pakistan until the removal of the Taliban government in late 2001.

Karimi returned to his special-operations roots at Fort Bragg, North Carolina in February 2010. Previously, he served as the Chief of Operations for the Afghan Ministry of Defense.

Education
Karimi isrban High School in Pashto, Dari, and English. He received his primary education at Sa, followed by a Military High School in Kabul. 
National Military Academy of Afghanistan in Kabul
Kabul Commando Course (C) Kabulst
CGSC (Staff Course A) Kabul
Royal Military Academy Sandhurst in the United Kingdom
Fort Bragg in North Carolina
Infantry Advance Course, Ranger course, Special Forces Course. Airborne Course (USA)
Counter Insurgency and Intel Courses (India)
NDC (India)
Commando Course (Egypt)
Near East and South Asia Strategic Studies. NESA.NDU (USA) Assignments:
Platoon Commander, Commando BN, Company Commander, XO Battalion
Battalion Commander
Adjutant Guard Brigade
G3 Division
DG2 Central Corps
DCS for Mobilization and Organization
Special Assistant to CoS and head of the Advisory Board
Deputy Chairman for DDR
G3 ANA – Chief Operations

References

External links

Living people
Afghan military personnel
Pashtun people
1945 births
Afghan expatriates in Pakistan
Afghan military officers
National Defence College, India alumni